Gift Lunga (born 26 February 1976) is a retired Zimbabwean football midfielder.

References

1976 births
Living people
Zimbabwean footballers
Zimbabwe international footballers
Highlanders F.C. players
CAPS United players
Association football midfielders